C. hominis  may refer to:
 Campylobacter hominis, a Gram-negative, spiral, microaerophilic bacterium species in the genus Campylobacter
 Cardiobacterium hominis, a bacterium species that normally resides in the respiratory tract but is said to play a role in causing endocarditis
 Cryptosporidium hominis, a medically important protozoan species

See also
 Hominis (disambiguation)